Emsad Zahirovic (born April 9, 1988) is an American soccer player of Bosnian origin who most recently played for Atlanta Silverbacks of the North American Soccer League.

Career

Amateur
Zahirovic came to the United States from his native Bosnia in 2000 at the age of 12, and grew up in Snellville, Georgia. He graduated from Shiloh High School, but did not play college soccer, and instead played in the Atlanta District Amateur Soccer League between 2006 and 2010, most notably for the ethnic Bosnian team B&H International. Zahirovic led the ADASL in scoring in three of his seasons in the league, scoring 23 goals in just 15 games in 2010.

Professional
Zahirovic turned professional in February 2011 when he signed with Atlanta Silverbacks of the North American Soccer League. He made his professional debut on April 23, 2011, in a game against the Fort Lauderdale Strikers. Zahirovic was released from Atlanta on August 30, 2011, due to breach of contract.

References

1988 births
Living people
Bosnia and Herzegovina emigrants to the United States
People from Snellville, Georgia
Sportspeople from the Atlanta metropolitan area
Soccer players from Georgia (U.S. state)
American soccer players
Association football forwards
Atlanta Silverbacks players
North American Soccer League players